Vaccinium  is a common and widespread genus of shrubs or dwarf shrubs in the heath family (Ericaceae). The fruits of many species are eaten by humans and some are of commercial importance, including the cranberry, blueberry, bilberry (whortleberry), lingonberry (cowberry), and huckleberry. Like many other ericaceous plants, they are generally restricted to acidic soils.

Description
Some tropical species are epiphytic. Stems are usually woody. Flowers are epigynous with fused petals, and have long styles that protrude from their bell-shaped corollas. Stamens have anthers with extended tube-like structures called "awns" through which pollen falls when mature. Inflorescences can be axillary or terminal. The fruit develops from an inferior ovary, and is a four- or five-parted berry; it is usually brightly coloured, often being red or bluish with purple juice. Roots are commonly mycorrhizal, which likely help the plants to access nutrients such as nitrogen and phosphorus in the acidic, nutrient-poor soils they inhabit.

Taxonomy
The genus was first described scientifically by Carl Linnaeus in 1753. The name Vaccinium was used in classical Latin for a plant, possibly the bilberry or a hyacinth, and may be derived from the Latin bacca, berry, although its ultimate derivation is obscure. It is not the same word as Vaccinum "of or pertaining to cows".

The taxonomy of the genus is complex, and still under investigation. Genetic analyses indicates that the genus Vaccinium is not monophyletic. A number of the Asian species are more closely related to Agapetes than to other Vaccinium species. A second group includes most of Orthaea and Notopora, at least some of Gaylussacia (huckleberry), and a number of species from Vaccinium, such as Vaccinium crassifolium. Other parts of Vaccinium form other groups, sometimes together with species of other genera. The taxonomy of Vaccinium can either be resolved by enlarging the genus to include the entirety of the tribe Vaccinieae, or by breaking the genus up into several different genera.

Subgenera

A classification predating molecular phylogeny divides Vaccinium into subgenera, and several sections:

Subgenus Oxycoccus The cranberries, with slender, trailing, wiry non-woody shoots and strongly reflexed flower petals. Some botanists treat Oxycoccus as a distinct genus.
Sect. Oxycoccus
Vaccinium macrocarpon – American cranberry
Vaccinium oxycoccos – common cranberry
Vaccinium microcarpum – small bog cranberry
Sect. Oxycoccoides
Vaccinium erythrocarpum – southern mountain cranberry
Subgenus Vaccinium All the other species, with thicker, upright woody shoots and bell-shaped flowers
Sect. Batodendron
Vaccinium arboreum – sparkleberry
Vaccinium crassifolium – creeping blueberry
Sect. Brachyceratium
Vaccinium dependens
Sect. Bracteata
Vaccinium acrobracteatum
Vaccinium barandanum
Vaccinium bracteatum
Vaccinium coriaceum
Vaccinium cornigerum
Vaccinium cruentum
Vaccinium hooglandii
Vaccinium horizontale
Vaccinium laurifolium
Vaccinium lucidum
Vaccinium myrtoides
Vaccinium phillyreoides
Vaccinium reticulatovenosum
Vaccinium sparsum
Vaccinium varingifolium
Sect. Ciliata
Vaccinium ciliatum
Vaccinium oldhamii - Japanese blueberry
Sect. Cinctosandra
Vaccinium exul
Sect. Conchophyllum
Vaccinium corymbodendron
Vaccinium delavayi
Vaccinium emarginatum
Vaccinium griffithianum
Vaccinium moupinense – Himalayan blueberry
Vaccinium neilgherrense
Vaccinium nummularia
Vaccinium retusum
Sect. Cyanococcus – typical North American blueberries
Vaccinium angustifolium – lowbush blueberry - also known as Vaccinium stenophyllum
Vaccinium boreale – northern blueberry
Vaccinium caesariense – New Jersey blueberry
Vaccinium corymbosum – highbush blueberry
Vaccinium darrowii – evergreen blueberry
Vaccinium elliottii – Elliott's blueberry
Vaccinium formosum
Vaccinium fuscatum – black highbush blueberry; syn. V. atrococcum
Vaccinium hirsutum
Vaccinium myrsinites – evergreen blueberry
Vaccinium myrtilloides – Canadian blueberry
Vaccinium pallidum Ait. – dryland blueberry (images); syn. V. vacillans Torr.
Vaccinium simulatum
Vaccinium tenellum
Vaccinium virgatum – rabbiteye blueberry; syn. V. ashei
Sect. Eococcus
Vaccinium fragile
Sect. Epigynium
Vaccinium vacciniaceum
Sect. Galeopetalum
Vaccinium chunii
Vaccinium dunalianum
Vaccinium glaucoalbum
Vaccinium sikkimense (may not be treated as a separate species from V. glaucoalbum)
Vaccinium urceolatum
Sect. Hemimyrtillus
Vaccinium arctostaphylos
Vaccinium cylindraceum
Vaccinium hirtum
Vaccinium padifolium – Madeira blueberry
Vaccinium smallii
Sect. Koreanum
Vaccinium koreanum – Korean blueberry
Sect. Myrtillus (including sect. Macropelma) – bilberries and relatives. Monophyly of this section has been confirmed by matK and nuclear ribosomal ITS sequence data.
Vaccinium calycinum Sm. –  (Hawaii)
Vaccinium cereum (L.f.) Forst.f. – east Polynesian blueberry, Pacific blueberry
Vaccinium cespitosum – dwarf bilberry
Vaccinium deliciosum – Cascade bilberry, Cascade blueberry, blueleaf huckleberry
Vaccinium dentatum Sm. –  (Hawaii)
Vaccinium membranaceum – square-twig blueberry, thinleaf huckleberry, tall huckleberry, big huckleberry, mountain huckleberry, "black huckleberry"
Vaccinium myrtillus – common bilberry, blue whortleberry, blaeberry, fraughan, hurtleberry
Vaccinium ovalifolium – Alaska blueberry, early blueberry, oval-leaf blueberry
Vaccinium parvifolium – red huckleberry
Vaccinium praestans – krasnika, Kamchatka bilberry
Vaccinium reticulatum –  (Hawaii)
Vaccinium scoparium – grouse whortleberry, grouseberry, littleleaf huckleberry
Vaccinium shastense - Shasta huckleberry
Sect. Neurodesia
Vaccinium crenatum
Sect. Oarianthe
Vaccinium ambyandrum
Vaccinium cyclopense
Sect. Oreades
Vaccinium poasanum
Sect. Pachyanthum
Vaccinium fissiflorum
Sect. Polycodium
Vaccinium stamineum L. – deerberry; syn. V. caesium (eastern North America) (images)
Sect. Pyxothamnus
Vaccinium consanguineum
Vaccinium floribundum
Vaccinium meridionale
Vaccinium ovatum Pursh – California huckleberry (or evergreen huckleberry) (coastal western North America). First collected and described for western science by Meriwether Lewis.
Sect. Vaccinium
Vaccinium uliginosum L. – northern (or bog) bilberry (or blueberry); syn. V. occidentale (northern North America and Eurasia)
Sect. Vitis-idaea
Vaccinium vitis-idaea L. – partridgeberry, cowberry, redberry, red whortleberry, or lingonberry (northern North America and Eurasia)

Distribution and habitat
The genus contains about 450 species, which are found mostly in the cooler areas of the Northern Hemisphere, although there are tropical species from areas as widely separated as Madagascar and Hawaii. The genus is distributed worldwide except for Australia and Antarctica, but areas of great Vaccinium diversity include the montane regions of North and South America, as well as Southeast Asia. Species are still being discovered in the Andes.

Plants of this group typically require acidic soils, and as wild plants they live in habitats such as heath, bog and acidic woodland (for example, blueberries under oaks or pines). Blueberry plants are commonly found in oak-heath forests in eastern North America. Vaccinium is found in both successional and stable sites, and is fire-adapted in many regions, withstanding low-intensity burns, and re-sprouting from rhizomes when above-ground tissues are burned off.

Ecology
Vaccinium species are used as food plants by the larvae of a number of Lepidoptera (butterfly and moth) species – see list of Lepidoptera that feed on Vaccinium. Berries of North American species nourish a variety of mammals and birds, notably including the grizzly bear.

Fossil record
Two fossil seeds of †Vaccinium minutulum have been extracted from borehole samples of the Middle Miocene fresh water deposits in Nowy Sacz Basin, West Carpathians, Poland.

Production 
Blueberries (sect. Cyanococcus) and cranberries (sect. Oxycoccus) are relatively newly cultivated plants, and are largely unchanged from their wild relatives. Genetic breeding of blueberries began around the turn of the 20th century, and was spearheaded by Frederick Coville who performed many cross-breeding trials and produced dozens of new blueberry cultivars. He often tested new cultivars for their flavor, and claimed that after a long day of tasting, "all blueberries taste the same, and all taste sour."

See also
Malea pilosa
Gaylussacia
Blueberry

References

External links

Vaccinium information from U.S. National Plant Germplasm System
British Towns and Villages Network, Vaccinium; Species of the Genus Vaccinium

 
Ericaceae genera
Taxa named by Carl Linnaeus
Subshrubs